Ana Kokić (born 11 March 1983), is a Serbian singer-songwriter, television personality and actress.

Career
Kokić began her singing career in the late 90s as a member of the less-known dance-pop group, called Energie, with whom she released three albums. She eventually pursued a solo career with her debut album Mojna mala, released in 2006 under Grand Production. It spawned hit songs like the title track and "Ćujem da". Her second album Šta če meni ime... was released in the following year, selling in 200,000 copies. In 2011, she made a comeback to recording music after several years of hiatus with the release of her album Psiho, which featured a duet with Romanian artist Costi Ioniță, titled "Idemo na sve". The album was sold in 100,000 copies.

In December 2013, Kokić received wide attention for winning the first season of the Serbian television show Tvoje lice zvuči poznato. 

Additionally, she also starred as singer Silvana Armenulić in the movie Bićemo prvaci sveta (2015) and made her theatre debut in the comedy play Čekajući ministra in 2017.

Personal life
Kokić graduated from the Geological and Hydrometeorological High School "Milutin Milanković" in Belgrade.

Between 2008 and 2019 she was married to Serbian water polo player Nikola Rađen, with whom she has two daughters.

Discography
Studio albums
Mojne mala (2006)
Šta će meni ime... (2007)
Psiho (2011)

Filmography

References

External links
 
 

1983 births
Living people
21st-century Serbian women singers
Serbian folk-pop singers
Serbian pop singers
Grand Production artists
Serbian television personalities
Your Face Sounds Familiar winners